Hole in the Mountain Prairie is a preserved remnant of the tallgrass prairie in southwestern Minnesota.  It is owned and administered by The Nature Conservancy.

Geography
Hole in the Mountain Prairie is located on Buffalo Ridge near the town of Lake Benton in Lincoln County, southwestern Minnesota.

Flora
The preserve is home to about 60 species of grasses and emergent vegetation, and about 200 species of wildflowers. Trees are a minor feature, with only about 10 species present.

Fauna
Whitetail deer, foxes, and numerous rodents are present, but The Nature Conservancy touts the butterflies of Hole in the Mountain as the most unusual and significant of its creatures.  In 2017 an attempt was made by the Minnesota Zoo to reintroduce the nearly-extinct Dakota Skipper butterfly to Hole in the Mountain, from which it had disappeared in the previous decade.

Geology

Notes

Prairies
Grasslands of Minnesota